The Brückepreis (Bridge prize) is an international prize given annually to a person who contributed by a life's work to better understanding between peoples (Völkerverständigung, Cultural diplomacy) in Europe. It is awarded annually, beginning in 1993, by the town of Görlitz/Zgorzelec. The  (Town of Europe) lies in both Germany and Poland, connected by a bridge across the Neisse river, and not far from the Czech Republic. The bridge appears in the prize name also for building bridges among peoples and states, as Norbert Lammert, the president of the Bundestag, expressed in his laudatio for Arvo Pärt in 2007. The official name is Internationaler Brückepreis der Europastadt Görlitz/Zgorzelec. The prize money is €2,500. The prize is managed by an association, Gesellschaft zur Verleihung des Internationalen Brückepreises der Europastadt Görlitz/Zgorzelec.

The Euro-Mediterranean Human Rights Monitor (Euro-Med) & Hamas called on the Brückepreis Prize to withdraw the 2020 prize awarded to former Israeli official Tzipi Livni who’s accused of alleged war crimes and crimes against humanity committed in the blockaded Gaza Strip during Operation Case Lead 2008/9 when she was Israel’s Foreign Minister.

Recipients 
1993 Marion Gräfin Dönhoff, journalist, editor of the weekly Die Zeit
1995 Adam Michnik, chef editor of the daily Gazeta Wyborcza
1998 Jiří Gruša, president of P.E.N. International, former Czech ambassador, and writer
1999 Freya von Moltke, founder of the  "Stiftung Kreisau für europäische Verständigung" (Kreisau foundation for cultural diplomacy)
2000 Arno Lustiger, publisher
2001 Miloslav Vlk, Cardinal, Archbishop of Prague
2002 Władysław Bartoszewski, former Polish Foreign minister
2003 Kurt Biedenkopf, former prime minister
2004 Valdas Adamkus, President of Lituania
2005 Giora Feidman, musician engaged in reconciliation between cultures
2006 Günter Grass, writer (not accepted)
2007 Arvo Pärt, composer
2008 Fritz Stern, German-born US-American historian
2009 Norman Davies, British historian
2010 Tadeusz Mazowiecki, former Polish Prime Minister
2011 Gesine Schwan, former president of the Viadrina European University
2012 Vitali Klitschko, boxer and Ukrainian politician
2013 Steffen Möller, actor and cabarettist
 2014 Jean-Claude Juncker, politician in Luxembourg and Europe
 2015 Olga Tokarczuk, Polish writer
 2016 Timothy Garton Ash, British historian and writer
 2017 Alfons Nossol, former bishop of Opole
 2018 Daniel Libeskind, architect
 2019 Bente Kahan, musician and actor
 2020 Tzipi Livni, Israeli politician, former Israeli Foreign Minister
 2022 Herta Müller, German novelist, poet and essayist

References

External links 
 

Görlitz
European awards
Peace awards